The 34th Directors Guild of America Awards, honoring the outstanding directorial achievements in film and television in 1981, were presented on March 13, 1982 at the Beverly Hilton and the Plaza Hotel. The television nominees were announced on February 9, 1982.

Winners and nominees

Film

Television

Commercials

D.W. Griffith Award
 Rouben Mamoulian

Frank Capra Achievement Award
 David Golden
 Wallace Worsley Jr.

References

External links
 

Directors Guild of America Awards
1981 film awards
1981 television awards
Direct
Direct
Directors
Directors Guild of America Awards
Directors Guild of America Awards
Directors Guild of America Awards